The March 2013 United Kingdom winter storm was an exceptional weather event that took place in the United Kingdom and Ireland on the night of 22–23 March 2013. Described as 'the worst snowfall for 30 years', the event brought chaos to many parts of Northern England, Northern Wales, Northern Ireland and Scotland. The worst places affected were North West England, North East Wales and Northern Ireland. Also accompanying the snow were very strong winds and very cold weather. At least two deaths were reported.

Meteorological History
The storm formed late on 15 March just off the coast of Newfoundland as a result of the what happeed effect. It remained intertwined with another area of low pressure that sat over the far north of Canada until the 18th, when the low dissipated. The cyclone split into two, also on the 18th, with the cyclone to the north dissipating only hours after forming. The storm then gathered momentum and moved into the central North Atlantic by 18:00 on the 20th, as well as rapidly increasing in size. It also further increased in size, extending its influence from southern Portugal to just south of Greenland.

The weather fronts produced heavy rain over the far south west of the British Isles, but heavy snow to places further north over the 22nd and 23rd. However, it ultimately was weakened by the intense anticyclone block to the north. The storm weakened further on the 25th and was incorporated into a stronger area of low pressure, centred off the coast of Newfoundland.

Impacts 
Snowfall, strong winds and low temperatures were main features during the event.

Snowfall

Temperature
For many, the lowest daily maximum temperature of the month occurred on 24 March, just after the passing of the storm. At Cairngorm, the maximum temperature on 24 March was only . However, this was not the coldest day of the month.

Wind
Winds were very strong during the event; average wind speeds of up to 60 mph were recorded in the worst-hit areas of north-west England, south-west Scotland and Northern Ireland. This led to widespread disruption.

References 

Blizzards
2013 in the United Kingdom